Kevin Gage (born May 26, 1959) is an American character actor known for his role in the crime film Heat (1995), in which he portrayed the murderous rogue criminal Waingro. Other roles of his have included United States Navy SEALs instructor Max Pyro in the military film G.I. Jane (1997), and Detective Mike Gage in the police thriller Strangeland (1998).

Personal life
Gage was married to late actress Kelly Preston from 1985 to 1987.

On July 30, 2003, Gage was sentenced to 41 months in federal prison, starting September 29, 2003, for cultivating marijuana despite owning a California-issued license for medicinal marijuana. Gage stated that he cultivated medicinal cannabis to help him cope with chronic pain and stress from injuries suffered in a 1993 car crash, as well as for a sister with cancer and brother with multiple sclerosis. He was released on March 17, 2006.

Gage married Shannon Perris-Knight in 2006; their son was born in January 2007. Perris-Knight was diagnosed with inoperable brain cancer in 2008 and died in 2014.

Filmography

Film

Television

Video games

References

External links

1959 births
American male film actors
American male television actors
American male voice actors
20th-century American male actors
21st-century American male actors
Living people
Male actors from Wisconsin
American people convicted of drug offenses